Scopula agrata is a moth of the family Geometridae. It is found on the Moluccas.

References

Moths described in 1875
agrata
Moths of Indonesia